Aglaia parksii is a species of plant in the family Meliaceae. It is found in Fiji, Papua New Guinea, and the Solomon Islands.

References

parksii
Vulnerable plants
Taxonomy articles created by Polbot